Thalappoli is a ritual ceremony performed as a vow in Hindu temples in Kerala, India. It is also performed to usher the bride and groom to the wedding hall and the special guests to public events.

Ritual

Thalappoli is a ritual ceremony performed as a vow in Hindu temples in Kerala, India. Bathed and dressed in beautiful traditional clothes and Kerala ornaments, the women, mainly girls, line up with holding a thalam (a metal plate) in their hands filled with fresh paddy, flowers, rice, coconut (usually broken into two pieces), a lighted lamp and go around the temple with kurava (traditional form of sound), shouts and playing of instruments. This was regularly practiced in the temples of bhagavathy (Bhadrakali).

Thalappoli festivalis observed in many Hindu temples across Kerala. some noted temples include Kodungallur Bhagavathy Temple, Pattupurackal Bhagavathy Temple, Chengannur Mahadeva Temple, Thalappoli performed by virgins girls is an important ceremony in Attukal Temple. Pilleru thalappoli, the thalappoli by kids is performed at Guruvayur temple. In Kottankulangara Devi Temple in Chavara, there is a special ritual where men dress up as women and perform thalappoli.

Origin
In Kerala Hindu culture, it is considered auspicious to see the ashta mangalyas (eight blessed elements) - a mirror, a lamp, a vessel filled with water, a new garment, akshatham (the combination of rice and paddy), gold, a girl, and Kurava (a sound that signifies happiness). It is believed that its simplified form was transformed into talappoli.

There is another argument that 'Thalappoli' is related to Buddhism and Jainism that existed in Kerala. It is said that the heads of Buddhists or Jain monks were eventually cut off after fierce debate with Brahmin scholars. And it is believed that the 'Thala Poli' celebration, where cut off 'thala' (Malayalam word for 'head') or tongues are paraded around on a plate, later evolved into 'Thalappoli'.

Non-ritual
Now Thalapoli is also performed to usher the bride and groom to the wedding hall and the special guests to public events.

Criticisms
Women standing for hours in the sun and even at night waiting for ministers and government guests has drawn criticism in various ways. Following that, the cabinet meeting in May 2016 decided to ban talappoli of women to receive ministers in Kerala. Similarly, in 2022, Kerala Education Minister V. Sivankutty has called for an end to the practice of lining up students as thalappoli, to welcome guests at various programs in schools.

The misogyny in Thalappoli has also been criticized. Thiruvangod C. Krishna Kurup writes in his book Kerala charithram Parasuramaniloode (Kerala History Through Parashurama) that in the earlier times, women are lined up like objects of display without covering their breasts, and this system was created and implemented by the priest class so that they could see and enjoy it.

See also
Puja thali

References

Hindu rituals
Kerala folklore
Culture of Kerala
Buddhism in Kerala